George Jackson (17 June 1893 – 1985) was an English footballer who played as a full back for Merthyr Town, Tranmere Rovers and South Liverpool. He made 114 appearances for Tranmere.

References

1893 births
1985 deaths
Footballers from Liverpool
Association football fullbacks
English footballers
Merthyr Town F.C. players
Tranmere Rovers F.C. players
South Liverpool F.C. players